Daniel Quine Auerbach (born May 14, 1979) is an American musician, singer-songwriter, and record producer, best known as the guitarist and vocalist of The Black Keys, a blues rock band from Akron, Ohio. As a member of the group, Auerbach has recorded and co-produced eleven studio albums with his bandmate Patrick Carney. Auerbach has also released two solo albums, Keep It Hid (2009) and Waiting on a Song (2017), and formed a side project, the Arcs, which released the albums Yours, Dreamily, (2015) and Electrophonic Chronic (2023).

Auerbach owns the Easy Eye Sound recording studio in Nashville, Tennessee, as well as a record label of the same name. He has produced records by artists such as Cage the Elephant, Dr. John, Lana Del Rey, Ray LaMontagne, CeeLo Green, Hank Williams Jr and the Pretenders. In addition to winning several Grammy Awards as a member of the Black Keys, Auerbach received the 2013 Grammy Award for Producer of the Year, Non-Classical and was nominated again for the award in 2020, 2021 and 2023.

Childhood and early life
Auerbach was born in Ohio, and is the son of Mary Little (née Quine; b. about 1948), a teacher of French, and Charles Auerbach (b. about 1950), an antique dealer. His father is of Polish Jewish descent and his mother is of part Manx descent. His maternal cousin, twice removed, was philosopher and logician Willard Van Orman Quine, and his second cousin once removed was the late guitarist Robert Quine. Auerbach grew up in a family with musical roots. Auerbach became infatuated with blues after listening to his father's old vinyl records during his childhood, his first concert was Whitney Houston with his mother at the Blossom Music Center in Cuyahoga Falls, OH. His second concert was a Grateful Dead show with his father at the Richfield Coliseum in Cleveland. He was influenced early on by his mother's side of the family, notably his uncles who played bluegrass music.

Auerbach described himself as a normal teenager in high school who smoked marijuana and captained the soccer team at Firestone High School. He attended University of Akron. During college Auerbach was heavily influenced by Junior Kimbrough, eventually resulting in his dropping out to pursue the guitar more seriously. "I've listened to him so much, it's just how I hear it... I studied him so much... Getting F's in college, when I should've been studying, I was listening to Junior Kimbrough's music instead". Other major influences include: Robert Johnson, R.L. Burnside, Clarence White, Robert Nighthawk, T-Model Ford, Hound Dog Taylor, Mississippi Fred McDowell, Kokomo Arnold, Son House and RZA of the Wu-Tang Clan.

The Black Keys

Auerbach is best known for his work with The Black Keys. Auerbach and drummer Patrick Carney first met when they were eight or nine years old while living in the same neighborhood of Akron, Ohio. Carney is the nephew of saxophonist Ralph Carney, who performed on several Tom Waits albums. While attending Firestone High School, Carney and Auerbach became friends, though they were part of different crowds. Auerbach was captain of the high school soccer team, while Carney was a social outcast. Encouraged by their brothers, the duo began jamming together in 1996, as Auerbach was learning guitar at the time and Carney owned a four-track recorder and a drum set.

In an interview with Rolling Stone, the duo revealed that their big start came from a demo-recording session in Carney's basement. Auerbach initially went to record a demo with his band at the time but no one showed up. He and Carney then decided that they would just play instead. What came out of that session was ultimately sent out to several labels to try to secure a record deal.

While attending university, Auerbach met and began regularly playing guitar with fellow Ohio blues musician Patrick Sweany while continuing to work on material for The Black Keys with Carney. Sweany was a friend of Auerbach's father, but the younger Auerbach was recommended by a mutual friend, who was impressed by Dan's authenticity when playing the likes of RL Burnside and Junior Kimbrough. Auerbach spent 18 months playing in Sweany's band, mainly playing baritone guitar. Sweany told Guitar.com that one night after a gig, Auerbach played Sweany the mixes for the Black Keys debut album, and he knew that his time in the band was over, stating, "Man, this is really interesting... so um, can you help me train your replacement!?"

After signing with indie label Alive, they released their debut album, The Big Come Up, in 2002, which earned them a new deal with jazz/rock label Fat Possum Records. Their third album, Rubber Factory, was released in 2004 and received critical acclaim; it boosted the band's profile, eventually leading to a record deal with major label Nonesuch Records in 2006. After self-producing and recording their first four records in makeshift studios, in 2008 the duo completed Attack & Release in a professional studio and hired producer Danger Mouse, a frequent collaborator with the band.

The group's commercial breakthrough came in 2010 with Brothers, which along with its popular single "Tighten Up", won three Grammy Awards including Best Alternative Album of the Year. Their 2011 follow-up, El Camino, received strong reviews and reached number two on the Billboard 200 chart, leading to the first arena concert tour of the band's career, the El Camino Tour. The album and its hit single "Lonely Boy" won three Grammy Awards. In 2014, they released their eighth album, Turn Blue, their first number-one record in the US, Canada, and Australia.

In 2011 the Black Keys became one of only a couple of bands in Saturday Night Live's history to appear as the musical guest twice in one year. They played the January 8 episode as well as the December 3 episode.

After the touring for Turn Blue concluded, Auerbach and Carney took a break from The Black Keys. Both Auerbach and Carney have been on record talking about needing a break from the constant working process. Carney said, "I love making music with Dan and I'm excited for when we do that next, and we will do it. But both of us have PTSD from being on the road constantly". Auerbach added, "You can't just keep doing it, because it'll suck your brain dry".

After their hiatus The Black Keys returned in 2019 with the album Let's Rock produced by Danger Mouse with the chart-topping single "Lo/Hi". This was followed by 2021's Delta Kream, which consisted of blues covers performed with guitarist Kenny Brown and bassist Eric Deaton.

In 2022, The Black Keys announced Dropout Boogie.

Other performances and bands

The Barnburners
Auerbach was a member of a band called The Barnburners before forming The Black Keys in 2001. The Barnburners included Auerbach, Jason Edwards and Kip Amore. The Barnburners were a blues-based band that performed in Northeast Ohio clubs and released a 6-track album called The Rawboogie EP. The album includes the Junior Kimbrough song "Meet Me in the City", which Auerbach later covered with The Black Keys on their Chulahoma tribute studio album.

The Fast Five
The band Fast Five toured with Auerbach in 2009. The Fast Five's other members drew from the band Hacienda and percussionist Patrick Hallahan from My Morning Jacket. The original percussionist, Bob Cesare, was unable to perform with the Fast Five because of a death in his family.

Auerbach and fellow Black Keys member Patrick Carney met the members of Hacienda at a club, Emo's, in Austin, Texas while watching a band during the Austin City Limits Music Festival. Upon seeing one of the Hacienda band members hit on an intoxicated woman, Carney walked over and leaned in saying, "Dude, trust me, that's a bad idea." After becoming acquainted with each other, Auerbach e-mailed Hacienda a month later asking for more demos, which eventually led them to being asked to open for The Black Keys and Dr. Dog at a show in Austin, Texas. Afterward, Auerbach asked Hacienda to travel to Akron, Ohio where they would be his "guinea pigs" while recording Keep It Hid.

Blakroc
Blakroc was a studio album and collaboration by Auerbach and Carney of The Black Keys and Damon Dash, co-founder and former co-owner of Roc-A-Fella Records, who oversaw the project. The album featured a plethora of guest appearances from several indie and popular hip hop and R&B acts, namely Mos Def, Nicole Wray, Pharoahe Monch, Ludacris, Billy Danze of M.O.P., Q-Tip of A Tribe Called Quest, Jim Jones and NOE of ByrdGang, as well as Raekwon, RZA and the late Ol' Dirty Bastard of Wu-Tang Clan.

The Arcs
In 2015, Auerbach announced the formation of a new musical group known as The Arcs. Auerbach said about the band: "I just wanted to do my thing and get extra weird. I wanted everything to flow [and] be cohesive. It's basically everything I love about music all wrapped up into one record".

The debut album, Yours, Dreamily, was released later in the summer of 2015.

During the Bataclan Theatre massacre, Auerbach and his band The Arcs were performing at the similarly sized nearby venue Le Trianon. Auerbach subsequently stated, "I know people that were there last night. I know people who are like, ‘What am I gonna do – see the Arcs or the Eagles of Death Metal?' And I've woken up feeling very out of sorts. What do you call it, survivor's remorse? Why the hell did it happen there and not where we were playing? I'm just so brokenhearted about all those people."

On July 3, 2018, Richard Swift, the multi-instrumentalist and singer-songwriter who was a member of the Arcs, died at the age of 41. Swift and Auerbach were very close friends, with Auerbach describing Swift as "one of the most talented musicians I know".

The Arcs released their second album, Electrophonic Chronic, in January 2023.

Robert Finley
In 2017, blues musician Robert Finley got connected with Auerbach, and the pair released an original soundtrack for the graphic novel Murder Ballads, published by z2 Comics. Shortly after the release of the Murder Ballads soundtrack, Billboard announced that Finley would be releasing a full-length album produced and co-written by Auerbach.

The album, Goin' Platinum!, was released on Auerbach's Easy Eye Sound (Nonesuch Records) on December 8, 2017. The following year Finley joined Auerbach's Easy Eye Sound Revue tour.

In 2021, Finley announced the album Sharecropper's Son, to be released May 21, 2021 on Easy Eye Sound. The album is autobiographical in nature, and centers on Finley's upbringing on a crop share in Louisiana, and was produced by Auerbach.

Awards and honors
The Black Keys' 2010 album, Brothers, won three Grammy awards. At the 2013 Grammy Awards, Auerbach won the award for Producer of the Year, Non-Classical.

Also at the 2013 Grammy Awards, Auerbach won the award for Best Rock Song for his song "Lonely Boy", Best Rock Performance for "Lonely Boy", and Best Rock Album for El Camino.

In 2010, he joined the 9th annual Independent Music Awards judging panel to assist independent musicians' careers.

Personal life
Auerbach first married Stephanie Gonis, with whom he has a daughter, Sadie Little Auerbach, born in 2008. In 2013, they were divorced.

Auerbach, Patrick Carney, and Jack White have been involved in several public feuds. The roots of the conflict date back to 2012, when White banned Auerbach from his Nashville studio. 
They have since made amends and are now on good terms.

In 2010, Auerbach moved from Akron, Ohio to Nashville, Tennessee. He moved his record label Easy Eye Sound and bought a studio as soon as he moved into town. Auerbach has described Nashville as not just being "a little tourist music spot" but much more. As Auerbach grew older he realized Nashville was "the spot I wanted to go to. There's the most music that I felt a connection to".

Discography

Solo albums
Keep It Hid (2009)
Waiting on a Song (2017)

Solo singles
 "I Want Some More" (2009)
 "Heartbroken, In Disrepair" (2009)
 "Shine on Me" (2017)
 "Waiting on a Song" (12", Ltd, Bar / 2017)
 "Stand by My Girl" (2017)
 "King of a One Horse Town" (Digital / 2017)

with The Black Keys
The Big Come Up (2002)
Thickfreakness (2003)
Rubber Factory (2004)
Chulahoma (2006)
Magic Potion (2006)
Attack & Release (2008)
Brothers (2010)
El Camino (2011)
Turn Blue (2014)
Let's Rock (2019)
Delta Kream (2021)
Dropout Boogie (2022)

with Blakroc
Blakroc (2009)

with The Arcs
Yours, Dreamily, (2015)
The Arcs vs. The Inventors Vol. I (2015)
Electrophonic Chronic (2023)

Musical collaborations

Musical equipment

Guitars

Fender Jerry Donahue Telecaster
Harmony Stratotone H47
Harmony H78 Hollowbody
Harmony Heath TG-46
Harmony Rocket
Höfner 176 Galaxie 

Gibson Firebird VII
70's Gibson Les Paul Deluxe
60's Gibson SG Junior
Guild Thunderbird
Supro Martinique
Silvertone U1
Silvertone 1454
Rickenbacker 360
Ibanez SG copy
Ibanez Rocket Roll[flying v copy]
National Map
Teisco Del Rey SS-4L
Reverend Flatroc

Amplification
Fender Quad Reverb
Marshall JTM45 and vintage Marshall 8x10 cab
Fender '65 Twin Reverb Reissue
Fender Musicmaster Bass
Fender Super Reverb
Victoria Double Deluxe
1960s Fender blackface Princeton
1963 Fender Vibroverb

Effects
Ibanez Standard Fuzz
Sovtek Big Muff
Earthquaker Devices Hoof Fuzz
Gibson Maestro Fuzz Tone
Tubeplex tape delay
Fulltone Tape Echo
Boss TR-2 Tremolo
Analogman Sunface
Boss Super Shifter
Boss Super Octave
Nu Wah Fuzz Wah

References

External links

Cold Steel in the Midnight Hour: An Interview with Dan Auerbach of the Black Keys
The Black Keys – Interview
Pentatonic for the soul: Dan Auerbach of The Black Keys
Keep It Hid Review
Dan Auerbach live review on Citizen Dick
Dan Auerbach on Obscure Sound
Real Detroit Weekly – Dan Auerbach

1979 births
American blues guitarists
American male guitarists
American people of Manx descent
American people of Polish-Jewish descent
American rock guitarists
Blues rock musicians
Grammy Award winners
Living people
Singers from Ohio
Musicians from Akron, Ohio
The Black Keys members
University of Akron alumni
Guitarists from Ohio
21st-century American guitarists
21st-century American male singers
21st-century American singers
The Arcs members